Keith Yeung Kah-hung  is a Judge of the Court of First Instance of the High Court of Hong Kong, and was previously the 5th Director of Public Prosecutions of Hong Kong.

Legal career
Keith Yeung - Dương Gia-hùng received an LLB in 1986 and a PCLL in 1987 from the University of Hong Kong.

Yeung was called to the Hong Kong Bar in 1987 and was a barrister in private practice between 1988 and 2013. He was a member of Plowman Chambers. He took silk in 2009.

On 1 August 2013, Yeung was appointed as the Director of Public Prosecutions of Hong Kong. He was the first ethnic Chinese to take up this post.

Judicial career
Yeung sat as a Deputy Judge of the Court of First Instance of the High Court of Hong Kong for periods in 2013, 2018 and 2019.

On 29 July 2019, Yeung was appointed a Judge of the Court of First Instance of the High Court of Hong Kong.

Yeung was the Returning Officer for the 2022 Hong Kong Chief Executive election.

References

Living people
Hong Kong judges
Hong Kong Senior Counsel
Alumni of the University of Hong Kong
Barristers of Hong Kong
Hong Kong legal professionals
1964 births